Malika Oufkir (born April 2, 1953 in Marrakesh) is a Moroccan Berber writer and former "disappeared". She is the daughter of General Mohamed Oufkir and a cousin of fellow Moroccan writer and actress Leila Shenna.

Biography
Malika Oufkir is the eldest daughter of Mohamed Oufkir. Her siblings are Abdellatif, Myriam (Mimi), Maria, Soukaina, and Raouf. General Mohamed Oufkir was the interior minister, minister of defense, and the chief of the armed forces. He was very trusted by King Hassan II (and the most powerful figure in Morocco after the King) during the 1960s and early 1970s in Morocco. But after attempting to assassinate the King and Moroccan delegation returning from France on a Boeing 727 jet in a coup d'état in 1972, General Oufkir had several bullet wounds in his body, but it was ruled a suicide. Malika Oufkir and her family were initially confined to house arrest in the south of Morocco from 1973 to 1977. Then, General Oufkir's entire family was sent to the secret Tazmamart prison in the Sahara desert where they suffered harsh conditions for a total of 15 years. After escaping, they were released into house arrest in 1987. In 1991 they were among nine political prisoners to be released. On July 16, 1996, at the age of 43, Malika Oufkir emigrated to Paris accompanied by her brother Raouf and her sister Soukaina.

Malika Oufkir's life has inspired many to advocate for the rights of political prisoners. She and her siblings are converts from Islam to Catholicism, and she writes in her book, Stolen Lives, "We had rejected Islam, which had brought us nothing good, and opted for Catholicism instead." Her mother, however, remained a Muslim, but her siblings are Christians. "In our family," she asserts, "Christmas had always been sacred. Even at the Palace, where Islam was dominant, Christmas was still Christmas". Oufkir married Eric Bordreuil on October 10, 1998. They were married at the town hall of the 13th arrondissement in Paris.

Publications
Malika published an account of her life in prison, entitled Stolen Lives: Twenty Years in a Desert Jail, with Tunisian author Michèle Fitoussi. The book was first written in French, titled "La Prisonniere" with the help of author Michele Fitoussi. This account was later translated into English.

Further reading
 Malika Oufkir and Michèle Fitoussi (2001), Stolen Lives: Twenty Years in a Desert Jail, Miramax Books
  Malika Oufkir: the American Making of a Moroccan Star

References

External links
 ABC (Australian Broadcasting Corporation) Foreign Correspondent Interview
 Malika Oufkir: the American Making of a Moroccan Star

1953 births
1970s missing person cases
Berber Christians
Berber Moroccans
Berber writers
Converts to Roman Catholicism from Islam

Enforced disappearances in Morocco
Formerly missing people
French people of Berber descent
Human rights abuses in Morocco
Living people
Missing person cases in Morocco
Moroccan autobiographers
Moroccan former Muslims
Moroccan Roman Catholics
Moroccan writers
Moroccan women writers
People from Marrakesh
Women autobiographers
Violence against women in Morocco